Yoto may refer to:

 Yoto Prefecture, Maritime Region, Togo
 Yoto Yotov (born 1969), Bulgarian and Croatian weightlifter
 Yōto Yokodera, the main character of the Japanese light novel series The "Hentai" Prince and the Stony Cat
 Yoto (prince) (1599–1639), first bearer of the Qing Dynasty title Prince Keqin
 Yōtō (also The Amorous Blade), a 1926 film directed by Hiroshi Shimizu
 "Yōtō" (also "Demon Sword"), a 2011 episode of Garo: Makai Senki
 Yoto (company), a British technology company that specializes in audio devices for children

See also 
 The Bane of Yoto, a 2012 novel by Josh Viola and Nicholas Karpuk
 Toko'yoto, the Chukchi god of the sea